The 1994 European Grand Prix (formally the XXXIX Gran Premio de Europa) was a Formula One motor race held on 16 October 1994 at the Circuito Permanente de Jerez, Jerez, Spain. It was the fourteenth race of the 1994 Formula One World Championship.

The 69-lap race was won from pole position by Michael Schumacher, driving a Benetton-Ford. Schumacher, returning from a two-race ban, took his eighth victory of the season by 24.6 seconds from Drivers' Championship rival Damon Hill in the Williams-Renault, with Mika Häkkinen third in a McLaren-Peugeot.

The win put Schumacher five points ahead of Hill with two races remaining, while Benetton regained the lead of the Constructors' Championship from Williams.

Background
The Argentine Grand Prix had been due to return to the Formula One calendar on this date, but ongoing modernisation of the Buenos Aires circuit meant that this was postponed until early in the  season. A race at Jerez, the first since , was organised in its place, and was given the title of the European Grand Prix, which had been used the previous year for the race at Donington Park.

Michael Schumacher returned to the Benetton team following his ban from the Italian and Portuguese Grands Prix, while Nigel Mansell returned to Williams, the 1994 CART season having ended the previous week. Elsewhere, Flavio Briatore bought Johnny Herbert's contract from Lotus's administrators and transferred him to Ligier, trading places with Éric Bernard, while rookies Hideki Noda and Domenico Schiattarella joined the Larrousse and Simtek teams respectively, replacing Yannick Dalmas and Jean-Marc Gounon.

Qualifying

Qualifying report
Schumacher took pole from Drivers' Championship rival Damon Hill by 0.13 seconds, with Mansell third but sixth tenths of a second behind Hill. Heinz-Harald Frentzen took fourth in the Sauber, followed by Rubens Barrichello in the Jordan and Gerhard Berger in the Ferrari. Herbert was seventh in the Ligier, with Gianni Morbidelli in the Footwork, Mika Häkkinen in the McLaren and Eddie Irvine in the second Jordan completing the top ten. Debutants Noda and Schiattarella were 24th and 26th respectively, with the two Pacifics of Bertrand Gachot and Paul Belmondo once again failing to qualify.

Qualifying classification

Race

Race report
At the start, Hill got ahead of Schumacher, while Mansell fell to sixth behind Frentzen, Barrichello and Berger. Mansell re-passed Berger on lap 2 and Barrichello on lap 6, before the Jordan driver got by again on lap 12. Noda's debut ended with a gearbox failure after ten laps; as he slowed, he was hit by Mansell, who subsequently pitted for a new nosecone and dropped out of contention.

Schumacher overtook Hill during the first round of pit stops; both were well clear of Frentzen - who was running a one-stop strategy - with Häkkinen up to fourth and Irvine fifth. Hill briefly went ahead again during the second stops, after which Schumacher retained a comfortable lead for the rest of the race. Frentzen's strategy backfired as he fell to seventh, behind Berger and Barrichello. Irvine moved ahead of Häkkinen and into third, only to be re-passed by the McLaren driver as a result of a quicker second stop. In the closing stages, Barrichello developed a left rear puncture, putting Frentzen back in the top six, just ahead of Ukyo Katayama's Tyrrell.

In a race of high reliability, nineteen cars were still running at the end, the last being Schiattarella (albeit five laps down), while Mansell was the last driver to retire, spinning off on lap 48. Schumacher's eventual margin of victory over Hill was 24.6 seconds, with another 45 seconds back to Häkkinen and a further nine back to Irvine, the last driver on the lead lap. Berger and Frentzen completed the top six, Frentzen holding off Katayama for the final point by 0.2 seconds. With two races remaining, Schumacher led Hill in the Drivers' Championship by five points, while Benetton moved back into the lead of the Constructors' Championship by two points from Williams.

In the second Sauber, Andrea de Cesaris made his 208th and final Grand Prix start, at the time second only to Riccardo Patrese. Karl Wendlinger was due to return to the Swiss team at the next race in Japan, following his crash at Monaco earlier in the season.

Race classification

Championship standings after the race

Drivers' Championship standings

Constructors' Championship standings

References

European Grand Prix
European Grand Prix
European Grand Prix
European Grand Prix